The 2021–22 Nemzeti Bajnokság II (also known as 2021–22 Merkantil Bank Liga) was Hungary's 71st season of the Nemzeti Bajnokság II, the second tier of the Hungarian football league system. The season began in July 2021.

Teams
The following teams have changed division since the 2020–21 season.

Team changes

To NB II

Although Iváncsa KSE finished 1st in the 2020-21 Nemzeti Bajnokság III Centre group, Kecskeméti TE were promoted.

From NB II

Stadium and locations

Following is the list of clubs competing in the league this season, with their location, stadium and stadium capacity.

Personnel and kits

Managerial changes

League table

Statistics

Number of teams by counties and regions

See also
 2021–22 Magyar Kupa
 2021–22 Nemzeti Bajnokság I
 2021–22 Nemzeti Bajnokság III
 2021–22 Megyei Bajnokság I

References

External links
  
  

Nemzeti Bajnokság II seasons
2021–22 in Hungarian football
Hun